The 3rd The Beatz Awards was held at Muson Center in Lagos on December 16, 2017. On September 1, the organizers call for entries, to be submitted through its portal, from the year in review August 3, 2016 to September 30, 2017. Nominees were revealed on October 26, 2017. The live show was televised on STV, Nigezie TV, wapTV, TVC, and BEN Television. 

The third edition was hosted by Seyi Law, and Angel Ufuoma.

Performers

Presenters
Seyi Law
Angel Ufuoma

Nominations and winners
The following is a list of nominees  and the winners are listed highlighted in boldface.

Special Recognition Awards
At the ceremony, the organizers honored:

References 

2017 music awards
2017 awards